C. R. Mahesh is an Indian politician from Kerala and a member of the Indian National Congress. He is a member of the Kerala Legislative Assembly from Karunagappally. Earlier he was the vice president of youth congress, Kerala. Currently he is an AICC member of INC and general secretary of Kerala Pradesh Congress Committee.

Political career
C. R. Mahesh was born in a family with communist political background. His grandfather Kaithavana Appukkuttan Pillai was an active communist party worker, who participated in the  Vallikunnam Meni Samaram, a political riot to save the labour rights of paddy field workers. His father the late C. A. Rajasekharan was a CPI worker. His brother the late C. R. Manoj (died on 4 August 2021) was an active worker of the CPI, served as the assistant local secretary of CPI, Thazhava committee.

Mahesh started his political career as the unit president of  Kerala Students Union (Students Organization of the Indian National Congress in Kerala) in Karunagappally model school. Later he joined for the higher studies in Political Science at Devaswom Board College, Sasthamcotta. During his college days he continued his political work with Kerala Students Union. He became the unit president of KSU in college. In the year of 2000, he got elected as the Union Chairman of Sasthamcotta DB College.

In 2005 local body election, he got elected as the member of Thazhava panchayath.

Mahesh held several positions like General Secretary of KSU Kollam district committee. Executive Member of Kerala Students Union state committee. General secretary of Youth Congress District committee, Kollam. President of Youth Congress District committee, Kollam.

2013 : Mahesh became the elected vice president of Indian Youth Congress, Kerala.
2016 : Mahesh contested from Karunagappally assembly constituency where he lost to CPI candidate R. Ramachandran by a margin of 1,759 votes.
Worked as the Member of Kerala State Youth Welfare Board.
Considering his organizing skills and leadership qualities, he got nominated as the member of All India Congress Committee and later as the general secretary of Kerala Pradesh Congress Committee.
2021 : Mahesh got elected to the Kerala Legislative Assembly from Karunagappally constituency in the 2021 Kerala Legislative Assembly election by defeating LDF sitting MLA R. Ramachandran by a record margin of 29,208 votes.

References

Indian National Congress politicians from Kerala
Living people
Kerala MLAs 2021–2026
1979 births